This is a list of dignitaries at the state funeral of John F. Kennedy. Kennedy was assassinated on November 22, 1963, in Dallas, Texas, and his state funeral took place on November 25, 1963, in Washington, D.C.

As President Kennedy lay in state, foreign dignitaries—including heads of state and government and members of royal families—started to arrive in Washington to attend the state funeral on Monday. Secretary of State Dean Rusk and other State Department personnel went to both of Washington's commercial airports to personally greet foreign dignitaries.

With so many foreign dignitaires attending the funeral, some law enforcement officials, including MPDC Chief Robert V. Murray, later said that it was the biggest security nightmare they ever faced.

Not since the funeral of Britain's King Edward VII, in 1910, had there been such a large gathering of presidents, prime ministers, and royalty at a state funeral. In all, 220 foreign dignitaries from 92 countries, five international agencies, and the papacy attended the funeral. The dignitaries including 19 heads of state and government and members of royal families. This was the largest gathering of foreign statesmen in the history of the United States.

Foreign delegations

A

B

C

D

E

F

G

H

I

J

K

L

M

N

P

R

S

T

U

V

Y

International organizations

Prominent Absences
Various world leaders and statesmen did not attend the slain president's funeral. Those not present attended memorial services in their respective countries. Some of the key notable absences included:
Australian Prime Minister Robert Menzies, citing the ongoing election campaign
Italian President Antonio Segni, who could not make the trip because of the flu
Indian Prime Minister Jawaharlal Nehru, on account of a helicopter crash that killed five Indian general officers on the same day as the assassination
Soviet Premier Nikita Khrushchev

References

Citations

Bibliography

John F. Kennedy-related lists
1960s politics-related lists
Assassination of John F. Kennedy
Kennedy, John F.
Kennedy, John F.
Kennedy, John
Washington, D.C.-related lists